Pseudotetracha kimberleyensis is a species of tiger beetle in the subfamily Cicindelinae that was described by Mjoberg in 1916, and is endemic to Australia.

References

Beetles described in 1916
Endemic fauna of Australia
Beetles of Australia